Muḥammad ʿAbd al-Mālik ibn Shams al-Ḥaqq ibn ʿAbd ar-Raḥmān ibn Ummīd ʿAlī al-Kumillāʾī (born 29 August 1969), or simply Muhammad Abdul Malek, is a Bangladeshi Islamic scholar, author and researcher. His magnum opus, Al Madkhal ila Ulum al Hadith al Sharif, is used as a textbook in the Muslim world. Abdul Malek is the co-founder, current director and Professor of Hadith of Markaz ad-Dawah al-Islamia as well as the founder of Al Kawsar monthly magazine. He is also a member of the Bangladesh Qawmi Madrasa Education Commission and Islamic Fiqh Academy, India.

Early life and education
Muhammad Abdul Malek was born on 29 August 1969 to a Bengali Muslim family in the village of Sarashpur in Laksam, Comilla District, East Pakistan. He was the second among the five children of Mawlana Muhammad Shamsul Hoque.

After brief homeschooling, Abdul Malek joined the Jamia Islamia Arabia Kherihar in Chandpur, a qawmi madrasah where his father was serving as headmaster. After passing the Fazilat Jamat, he went to Karachi and got admission in Jamia Uloom-ul-Islamia. He graduated with takmil from the faculty of Hadith studies in 1988. He specialised further in hadith studies under the guidance of Maulana Abdur Rashid Numani receiving his takhassus in 1991. He then enrolled at Dar-ul-Uloom, Karachi and specialised in Islamic jurisprudence and fatwa under the guidance of Muhammad Taqi Usmani, receiving his takhassus degree in Islamic jurisprudence in 1993. Abdul Malek set off for Saudi Arabia in 1995, where he became a researcher of fiqh under Abd al-Fattah Abu Ghudda in Riyadh until 1997.

Career 
In 1996, Abdul Malek co-founded Markaz ad-Dawah al-Islamia, an institution for higher Islamic research and education in Dhaka. He currently serves as its director and the head of the department of Hadith studies. In 2005, he founded the Islamic Bengali monthly, Al-Kawsar. Abdul Malek has also served as the Professor of Hadith at Jamiatul Uloom Al-Islamia in Dhaka as well as the khatib for Ajrun Karim Jame Mosque in Shantinagar. As a result of the Qaumi Madrasa state recognition in 2018, Abdul Malek was nominated as a member of the Bangladesh Qawmi Madrasa Education Commission.

Publications 
He publishes on Usulul Hadith, Usulul Fiqh, Qismatut Da'wah in Arabic language, Bengali and Urdu language. Some of those are published.

in Arabic 
 Al Madkhal ila Ulum al Hadith al Sharif

in Bengali 
 নবীজির নামায (Salat of Prophet): Primarily the translation of an Arabic book written by Muhammad Ilias Faisal. Muhammad Abdul Malek has edited this translation.
 তালিবানে ইলম : পথ ও পাথেয় (Guidelines for the Seekers of Knowledge) 
 উম্মাহর ঐক্য : পথ ও পন্থা (Unity of Muslim Ummah: Ways and Methods)
 সহীহ হাদীসের আলোকে তারাবীর রাকাআত সংখ্যা ও সহীহ হাদীসের আলোকে ঈদের নামায (Number of Rakat of Tarawih prayer and The Eid Prayer in light of 'Sahih' Hadith)
 হাদীস ও সুন্নাহে নামাযের পদ্ধতি (Procedure of Salat in the Hadith and Sunnah)
 প্রচলিত ভুল (Common Mistakes) : A collection of articles published in the "Common mistakes" section of The Monthly Al-Kawsar.
 কাবলাল জুমা : কিছু নিবেদন (Some requests about the Qablal Jumua prayer)
 ঈমান সবার আগে (Iman comes first)
 তাসাওউফ : তত্ত্ব ও বিশ্লেষণ (Sufism: Theory & Analysis) : This book begins with a translation of a book by Mufti Mahmud Ashraf Uthmani.
 এসব হাদীস নয় ১ and এসব হাদীস নয় ২ (These aren't Hadith) : These books have been written under his supervision and he has edited the books thoroughly.)
 নির্বাচিত প্রবন্ধ ১ and নির্বাচিত প্রবন্ধ ২ (Selected articles)
 আল কুরআনুল কারীম : কতিপয় হক ও আদব এবং অধ্যয়নের পথ ও পন্থা (Quran : Some of its rights and etiquettes, and the ways and methods of studying it)
 তাবলিগ জামাত : বর্তমান পরিস্থিতি ও উত্তরণের উপায়' (Tabligh Jamaat: current situation and its solutions)

See also 
 Abu Taher Misbah
 Sajidur Rahman
 Ibrahim Ujani

References

External links 
 The Monthly al-Kawsar - Online
 Maulana Muhammad Abdul Malek - Goodreads.com
 Maulana Muhammad Abdul Malek - Rokomari.com
 Bengali Books Collection - Archive.org

21st-century Islamic religious leaders
Bangladeshi Sunni Muslim scholars of Islam
Bengali Muslim scholars of Islam
Muslim scholars of Islamic jurisprudence
Hadith scholars
Living people
People from Comilla District
Sunni Muslim scholars of Islam
1969 births
Jamia Darul Uloom, Karachi alumni
21st-century Bengalis
20th-century Bengalis
Jamia Uloom-ul-Islamia alumni
Students of Muhammad Taqi Usmani
21st-century Arabic writers
Bangladeshi Arabic writers